This list of University of Wisconsin–River Falls alumni includes notable graduates, non-graduate former students, and current students of University of Wisconsin–River Falls (UWRF), a public, coeducational university located in River Falls, Wisconsin, United States.

Academia
 John Q. Emery, early university president
 Edward N. Peterson, historian

Business
 David Swensen, Chief Investment Officer, Yale University; member of President Barack Obama's Economic Recovery Advisory Board
 Daniel Florness, chief executive officer, Fastenal Company

Entertainment
 Michael J. Nelson, comedian (did not graduate)

Literature
 Boyd Huppert, journalist (Kare 11)
 Michael Norman, author
 Cathy Wurzer, journalist
 Rob Bignell, author

Politics
 William Berndt, Wisconsin State Senate
 William Walter Clark, former member of the Wisconsin State Assembly and Wisconsin State Senate
 Paul Dailey, Jr., former member of the Wisconsin State Assembly
 Kristen Dexter, former member of the Wisconsin State Assembly
 Steve Drazkowski, Minnesota politician
 Robert M. Dueholm, Wisconsin State Assembly
 Donald L. Iverson, former member of the Wisconsin State Assembly
 Robert P. Knowles, Wisconsin State Senate
 Mark W. Neumann, former congressman
 Harvey Stower, Wisconsin State Assembly
 Tom Tiffany, Wisconsin State Assembly
 Kenneth S. White, Wisconsin State Senate

Religion
 Francis Paul Prucha, Roman Catholic priest and educator

Sports
 Osborne Cowles, basketball coach
 Nate DeLong, former NBA player
 Jim Gagnon, former NFL player and professional wrestler
 Owen Schmitt, former NFL player
 Mike Young, minor league player and manager, Australia national baseball team player and coach and Australia national cricket team fielding coach

Other
 Daniel Brandenstein, astronaut 
 Jim Hall, programmer

References

External links 

 UWRF Alumni Relations
 UWRF Alumni Achievements

 
University of Wisconsin–River Falls
University of Wisconsin-River Falls alumni